Electoral district of Pakenham is an electoral district of the Legislative Assembly in the Australian state of Victoria. It was recreated in the redistribution of electoral boundaries in 2021, and was re-contested at the 2022 Victorian state election.

It includes the outer eastern suburbs of Officer and Pakenham, as well as less populated regional areas to the north and south of the Pakenham railway line.

Members for Pakenham

Election results

See also
 Parliaments of the Australian states and territories
 List of members of the Victorian Legislative Assembly

References

Electoral districts of Victoria (Australia)
1992 establishments in Australia
2002 disestablishments in Australia
2022 establishments in Australia
Shire of Cardinia